The 2010 North African Super Cup was the first edition of the competition initiated by the North African Football Union (UNAF), an annual football match between the winners of the previous season's North African Cup and North African Cup Winners Cup competitions.

The match was contested by 2009 North African Cup of Champions winners, ES Sétif, and 2009 North African Cup Winners Cup Champions, CS Sfaxien at the Stade 8 Mai 1945 in Sétif on 8 August 2010. ES Sétif won with a goal from forward Nabil Hemani in the 86th minute.

Match details

Champions

See also
 2009 North African Cup of Champions
 2009 North African Cup Winners Cup

External links
ESS 1 – CS Sfaxien 0 : Hemani offre un autre titre à l’Entente
UNAF - Super Coupe : ES Sétif 1-0 CS Sfax (TUN)
Entente Setif wins UNAF Super Cup

2010 in African football
2010
2010–11 in Algerian football
2010–11 in Tunisian football
ES Sétif matches
CS Sfaxien matches